The 435th Security Forces Squadron (435 SFS) is an airborne-capable United States Air Force Security Forces squadron based at Pulaski Barracks Army Installation, Germany. The 435th Security Forces Squadron's mission is to secure, protect and defend Air Force weapons systems, air base assets, personnel, and resources.  The squadron was most recently activated at Ramstein Air Base, Germany, on 15 January 2004.

Lineage
 Constituted as the 435 Air Police Squadron on 8 September 1950
 Activated in the reserve on 22 October 1950
 Ordered into active service on 1 March 1951
 Inactivated on 1 December 1952
 Activated in the reserve on 1 December 1952
 Inactivated on 17 January 1963
 Redesignated 435th Security Police Squadron
 Activated on 1 July 1975
 Inactivated on 1 April 1995
 Converted to provisional status and designated 435th Expeditionary Security Forces Squadron on 5 February 2001
 Returned to permanent status on 10 December 2003
 Redesignated 435th Security Forces Squadron on 15 December 2003
 Activated on 15 January 2004

Assignments
 435th Air Base Group, 22 October 1950 – 1 December 1952
 435th Air Base Group, 1 December 1952 – 17 January 1963
 435th Combat Support Group (later 435th Support Group), 1 July 1975 – 1 April 1995
 435th Security Police Group, 15 January 2004
 435th Mission Support Group, 3 May 2005
 435th Contingency Response Group, 16 July 2009 – present

Stations
 Miami International Airport, 22 October 1950 – 1 December 1952
 Miami International Airport, 1 December 1952
 Homestead Air Force Base, 25 July 1960  – 17 January 1963
 Rhein Main Air Base, Germany, 1 July 1975 – 1 April 1995
 Ramstein Air Base, Germany, 15 January 2004
 Pulaski Barracks Army Installation, Germany, 30 April 2013 – present

References

Bibliography

External links
USAF article

Security squadrons of the United States Air Force
Military units and formations established in 1950
1950 establishments in the United States